= Mandiganal =

- Village
- Location within Karnataka Location within India
- Coordinates: 15°06′40″N 75°20′25″E
- Country: India
- State: Karnataka
- District: Dharwad

Government
  - Type: Panchayat raj
  - Body: Gram panchayat Somashekhargouda Patil

Population (2011)
  - Total: 871

Languages
  - Official: Kannada
- Time zone: UTC+5:30 (IST)
- ISO 3166 code: IN-KA
- Vehicle registration: KA
- Website: karnataka.gov.in

Mandiganal is a village in Dharwad district of Karnataka, India.

== Demographics ==
As of the 2011 Census of India there were 188 households in Mandiganal and a total population of 871 consisting of 436 males and 435 females. There were 84 children ages 0-6.
